P. aurantium may refer to:
 Philautus aurantium, a frog species
 Polymastia aurantium, a sponge species

See also
 Aurantium